The Peel Football League (PFL) is a country football league based in the Peel region of Western Australia. The competition was formed in 1992 when teams from the Metropolitan Football League and Murray Districts Football League merged. There are currently seven clubs fielding a league reserves and colts team.

The formation years 
The Metropolitan Football League (MFL) was a predecessor to the PFL and competed from 1988 to 1991 under the administration of the Sunday Football League.  The six founding MFL teams in 1988 were Kwinana, Manning, Midland, Mosman Park, North Fremantle and Cockburn. In 1989, the MFL grew from 6 teams to 8 teams with the inclusion of Mundijong Centrals and Pinjarra.  These two teams were previously competing in the Murray Districts Football League (along with Harvey Town, South Mandurah and Waroona).

The MFL gained another two teams in 1990, with the admission of South Mandurah and Waroona, who were forced to join the league when the Murray Districts Football League disbanded at the end of the 1989 season.  Cockburn also did not compete in 1990, but re-entered for the final year of the MFL in 1991.

In 1992, the ten MFL teams broke ties with the Sunday Football League and combined with Mandurah (from the Sunday Football League) and Belmont to form the new Peel Football League (PFL).  In 1994, Midland, Mosman Park, Manning, North Fremantle, Cockburn and Belmont left the PFL to form Division 2 of the Sunday Football League (along with a new club from Kingsley).  However, the loss of these six teams was offset by the admission of Rockingham (from the WA Amateur Football League) and a new team from Harvey.

The information above was sourced from Sunday Football League Yearbooks and Westside Football Newspapers.

Current clubs

Former clubs

Grand final results 

League

Premierships

Honour board

Ladders 

2006																	
																																				

2007																																		
																																				

2008																																		
																												

2009																										
																																				

2010																																		
																																				

2011																																		
																												

2012																										
																																				

2013																																		
																																				

2014																																		
																												

2015																										
																																				

2016																	
																																				

2017																																		
																												

2018																										
																			

2019

AFL players who originally come from PFL clubs 
- Paul Bower (South Mandurah)- Carlton

- Daniel Haines (South Mandurah)- Fremantle

- Matt Riggio (Waroona) - North Melbourne

- Daniel Wells (Kwinana) - North Melbourne

- Hayden Ballantyne (Baldivis) - Fremantle

- Farren Ray (Mandurah) - Western Bulldogs/ St Kilda

- Brock O'Brien (Pinjarra) - Fremantle

- Nathan Wilson (Mandurah) - GWS Giants

- Brad Walsh (Rockingham) - Carlton

- Harley Bennell (Pinjarra) - Gold Coast/ Fremantle

- Ben Newton (Baldivis) - Port Adelaide/Melbourne

- Josh Schoenfeld (Rockingham) - Gold Coast

- Bradley Lynch (Mandurah) - Western Bulldogs

References 

Australian rules football competitions in Western Australia
Sport in Mandurah